ZLT may refer to:

 La Tabatière Airport in La Tabatière, Quebec, Canada (IATA code)
 Zero length launch a system to launch jet fighters.
 Zeppelin Luftschifftechnik GmbH & Co (see Zeppelin NT)